The discography of American drag queen, singer-songwriter, and comedian Trixie Mattel consists of four studio albums, four extended plays, one compilation album, 14 singles (including three as a featured artist), and 12 music videos.

Albums

Studio albums

Compilation albums

Extended plays

Singles

As lead artist

As featured artist

Other charted songs

Other appearances

Music videos

As lead artist

As featured performer

Notes

References

Country music discographies
Discographies of American artists
Folk music discographies